Nikolay Sergeyevich Zhilyayev (Nikolaj Sergejevič Žiljajev; 18 November (N.S.) 1881 – 20 January 1938), was a musicologist, and the teacher of several 20th-century composers. He was a victim of political repression in the Soviet Union.

He was a pupil of Mikhail Ippolitov-Ivanov and Sergei Taneyev at the Moscow Conservatory in around 1904. He went on to teach there himself. His pupils included the composers Yevgeny Golubev, Aram Khachaturian, Lev Knipper, Alexei Fedorovich Kozlovsky, Alexei Vladimirovich Stanchinsky, Anatoly Nikolayevich Alexandrov and Samuil Evgenyevich Feinberg.

He was a member of the Russian Academy of Art-Sciences and of the State Institute of Musical Science. He wrote many essays.

Death
Zhilyayev was shot shortly after his arrest during Joseph Stalin's state repression known as the Great Terror.

References
Mikhail Mishchenko: 'Zhilyayev, Nikolay Sergeyevich', Grove Music Online ed. L. Macy (Accessed 2 June 2007), <http://www.grovemusic.com>
A. Eaglefield-Hull (ed), A Dictionary of Modern Music and Musicians (Dent, London 1924)

External links
FIENBERG In Sound and Thought ARBITER 146 (AtOr): Classical CD Reviews- June 2006 MusicWeb-International at www.musicweb-international.com.

1881 births
1938 deaths
Musicologists from the Russian Empire
Musicians from Kursk
Great Purge victims from Russia
Writers from Kursk
Soviet musicologists